Sorochye Pole is a rural locality (a village) in Andomskoye Rural Settlement, Vytegorsky District, Vologda Oblast, Russia. The population was 7 as of 2002.

Geography 
Sorochye Pole is located 35 km north of Vytegra (the district's administrative centre) by road. Oparino is the nearest rural locality.

References 

Rural localities in Vytegorsky District